Malcolm Ian Offord, Baron Offord of Garvel (born 5 September 1964) is a Scottish financier and Conservative Party politician in the House of Lords and Parliamentary Under-Secretary of State for Scotland.

Early life and career 
Offord was born in Greenock, in September 1964. He was educated at Ardgowan Primary School and Greenock Academy, and graduated in Law from the University of Edinburgh.

Offord worked for six years from 1987 until 1993 at the merchant bank Lazard, in the Corporate Finance department specialising in mergers and acquisitions. In 1994, he began his private equity investing career with 3i plc followed by two years at Bankers Trust of New York where he was managing director of European Acquisition Finance.

In 1998, he joined Charterhouse Capital Partners as a partner and remained there for sixteen years, investing four European private equity funds before retiring as senior partner in December 2013.

Offord is the founder and chair of Edinburgh-based private equity company, Badenoch and Co. He has donated £147,500 to the Conservative Party.

Political career 
Offord was a member of the Advisory Board at the Centre for Social Justice, a right-wing think-tank established by former Conservative Party leader Iain Duncan Smith. In 2009, he wrote a paper called "Bankrupt Britain" in which he called for reforms to public spending.

During the campaign leading up to the 2014 Scottish independence referendum Offord was one of the directors (between 18 March 2014 and 1 January 2015) of an astroturfed campaign group called Vote No Borders Campaign that spent £147,510 (just short of the £150,000 limit). The group attracted controversy when it created an advert claiming that after independence Scots would struggle to get treatment at Great Ormond Street Hospital; the hospital objected that they hadn't been consulted, the claim wasn't true and asked for the advert to be withdrawn. Four years after the referendum the group received further attention as it had missed a deadline to file accounts with Companies House. Vote No Borders Campaign was dissolved 7 June 2016.

At the May 2021 Scottish Parliament election, Offord stood as a Scottish Conservatives list candidate for the Lothian electoral region, but having been placed fifth of the list he failed to gain a seat. His selection had been criticised by other Conservatives as "cronyism". One Conservative told the Edinburgh Evening News: "It seems all you need to get an endorsement is to have deep pockets." The article also mentioned that Offord’s support of the Conservatives goes back at least 14 years, with the businessman donating £15,000 as recently as November 2019.

During the 2021 election campaign, Offord wrote a series of essays entitled "The United Kingdom: Why Scotland Should Remain", some of which were published by Reform Scotland, Policy Exchange and The Spectator. One of Offord's essays published on the Reform Scotland think tank website cited the Government Expenditure and Revenue Scotland report in which he proposed that "It should be a matter of principle and pride for any Scottish government, Unionist or Nationalist, to reduce the gap between expenditure and revenue in Scotland. I do not want the case for the Union in Scotland to be built on the idea of dependency; I want our Union to be constructed on the idea of mutual benefit and reciprocity where England, Scotland, Wales and Northern Ireland all do their best to raise and share resources for the common good. Whether pro-Union or pro-Independence, this is a goal we should all unite around."

On 30 September 2021, it was announced that he would be made a life peer upon his appointment as Parliamentary Under-Secretary of State for Scotland. He was chosen instead of two Scottish Conservative MPs, Andrew Bowie and John Lamont. He was appointed on 4 October 2021. He was created Baron Offord of Garvel, of Greenock in the County of Renfrewshire, on 14 October and introduced to the House of Lords the next day. He should have made his maiden speech as a Lord in December 2021. However, he could not do so because he was self-isolating and gave the speech on 20 January 2022 instead.

Offord was reappointed as a Parliamentary Under Secretary of State in the Scotland Office by both Liz Truss and Rishi Sunak.

References

 

1964 births
Living people
Scottish company founders
Scottish financial businesspeople
Alumni of the University of Edinburgh
People educated at Greenock Academy
Conservative Party (UK) life peers
Scottish Conservative Party parliamentary candidates
People from Greenock
Private equity and venture capital investors
Government ministers of the United Kingdom
Life peers created by Elizabeth II